Parting Shots is a 1999 British dark comedy film starring Chris Rea, Felicity Kendal, Oliver Reed, Bob Hoskins, Diana Rigg, Ben Kingsley, John Cleese and Joanna Lumley. It was the final film directed by Michael Winner.

Upon release in the UK, the film gained controversy over its plot, and was widely criticised in the national press. It has since been evaluated as one of the worst films ever made.

Plot
After learning he is dying of cancer, failed wedding photographer Harry Sterndale (Chris Rea) illegally buys a gun and goes off to get revenge by killing all those who have made his life miserable.

Cast 

Chris Rea as Harry Sterndale
Felicity Kendal as Jill Saunders
Oliver Reed as Jamie Campbell-Stewart
Bob Hoskins as Gerd Layton
Diana Rigg as Lisa Sterndale
Ben Kingsley as Renzo Locatelli
John Cleese as Maurice Walpole
Joanna Lumley as Freda Armstrong
Gareth Hunt as Inspector Charles Bass
Nicholas Gecks as Detective Constable Ray
Patrick Ryecart as Graham Cleverley  
Peter Davison as John Fraser  
Nicky Henson as Askew  
Caroline Langrishe as Vanessa  
Edward Hardwicke as Dr. Phil Joseph  
Nicola Bryant as Beverley  
Brian Poyser as President Zlomov  
Sheila Steafel as President's Wife
Timothy Carlton as Commissioner Grosvenor
Roland Curram as Lord Selwyn  
Jenny Logan as Lady Selwyn
Sarah Parish as Ad Agency Receptionist
Mildred Shay as Old Lady at Wedding
Andrew Neil as TV Newsreader
Taryn Kay as Ruth Layton
Michael Ayers as Young Harry Sterndale

Background
Winner came up with the basic storyline after a relationship of his had ended. Speaking to Tim Sebastian of the BBC in June 1999, Winner revealed: "We all have people we'd like to kill. Sometimes we want to kill them for a long time and sometimes it just lasts the few seconds that they're cutting you up, or being a nuisance. A girlfriend parted very nastily, and I thought 'I really wouldn't mind killing you' and five or six years later I thought, 'I still wouldn't mind.'"

The majority of the cast was chosen personally by Winner, and included friends, those he had worked with professionally before, or other actors/actresses he wished to work with. Early discussions for the lead role suggested Neil Morrissey or Martin Clunes; however, when Winner met Chris Rea on a beach at Sandy Lane, Barbados, he was chosen instead.

After filming had come to an end, Winner had told his personal assistant, Dinah May, that Parting Shots was likely to be his last film. Regardless, he had said working with Rea was "a real pleasure" and that he had enjoyed making the film more than any of his past ones.

According to Peter Davison, John Alderton was offered the role of John Fraser. Alderton turned it down because of the violence, and the part went to Davison instead.

Reception
Parting Shots was not well received by critics, with Rotten Tomatoes giving the film an 11% of freshness while Total Film describes Winner's work as "offensive", "incompetent" and "bad in every possible way".
Andrew Collins gave a strongly negative
review of the film: "Parting Shots... is going to set the course of British film-making back 20 years. It is not only the worst British film produced in this country since Carry On Emmannuelle (quite a feat in itself), it is a thoroughbred contender for the crown of Worst Film Ever Made". In a hostile overview of Winner's films, Christopher Tookey claimed "Parting Shots is not only the most horrible torture for audiences that Winner has ever devised. It is also profoundly offensive, even by Winner's standards". 
Interviewed about Parting Shots, Charlotte O'Sullivan, 
The Independent's film editor, claimed Parting Shots was "the worst film I've ever seen". O'Sullivan also took issue with the film for glorifying vigilantism: "It's Michael Winner and you know, he doesn't have any sense of irony. He seems to be saying it is okay to go and kill people". The journalist Miles Kington later claimed "Parting Shots...was directed by Michael Winner and despite the glittering cast, was possibly the worst film ever made". In its entry on Michael Winner, the book Contemporary British and Irish Film Directors claimed Parting Shots "makes a bold challenge for the hotly contested mantle of worst British film ever made." British film historian I.Q. Hunter, discussing the question "What is the worst British film ever made?", listed Parting Shots as one of the candidates for that title.

See also
List of films considered the worst
Falling Down

References

External links

1990s serial killer films
1999 films
British black comedy films
British serial killer films
Films directed by Michael Winner
Films with screenplays by Michael Winner
British films about revenge
Films about cancer
Films produced by Michael Winner
1990s English-language films
1990s British films